István Bagyula (born 2 January 1969) is a retired Hungarian pole vaulter.

A new championship record at the time, it has not yet been beaten at the WJC.

International competitions

References

1969 births
Living people
Athletes from Budapest
Hungarian male pole vaulters
Olympic athletes of Hungary
Athletes (track and field) at the 1988 Summer Olympics
Athletes (track and field) at the 1992 Summer Olympics
World Athletics Championships medalists
World Athletics Championships athletes for Hungary
Universiade medalists in athletics (track and field)
Universiade gold medalists for Hungary
Medalists at the 1991 Summer Universiade
Medalists at the 1993 Summer Universiade
Medalists at the 1995 Summer Universiade